Nicolas Conte (born 26 December 1973) is a French snowboarder. He competed in the men's giant slalom event at the 1998 Winter Olympics.

References

External links
 

1973 births
Living people
French male snowboarders
Olympic snowboarders of France
Snowboarders at the 1998 Winter Olympics
Sportspeople from Annecy
20th-century French people